Speak is the debut studio album by American actress and singer Lindsay Lohan, released on December 7, 2004, by Casablanca Records. 

Speak was the first high-seller from Casablanca in several years, selling 1,000,000 copies in the United States. Speak received mixed reviews from music critics, with the most sympathetic critics commenting that Lohan "isn't a bad singer, but not an extraordinary singer either." In the United States, Speak peaked at number four on the Billboard 200 and was certified Platinum by the Recording Industry Association of America (RIAA). In Germany, Speak debuted at number 53 and took four weeks to complete its chart run.

The first two singles from Speak, "Rumors" and "Over", were both successes, with "Over" topping Billboard's Bubbling Under Hot 100 chart where it stayed for three weeks. It also did well internationally in countries such as Australia, Ireland and the United Kingdom. "Rumors" peaked at number six on the Bubbling Under Hot 100 chart and also did well in Australia and Germany, where it reached number 14. The accompanying music video for "Rumors" was nominated for "Best Pop Video" at the 2005 MTV Video Music Awards. Both songs received heavy airplay on MTV's Total Request Live. The third and final single, "First", was released to promote the 2005 film Herbie: Fully Loaded. "First" earned small success in Australia and Germany. Lohan promoted the album by performing the singles in a number of live appearances. Plans for a tour in Taiwan were planned, but were later scrapped.

Background
Lohan planned on releasing an album in the summer of 2001, according to her official website, llrocks.com. No album was released in 2001, but Lohan had begun recording demo tracks with Emilio Estefan Jr. He and his wife, Gloria, signed Lohan a five-album production deal in September 2002. "I am extremely excited to be working with Emilio. I am surrounded by a group of very talented people whom have made me feel like part of their family", Lohan said to the press. Also in September, Lohan landed the role as the daughter in Disney's 2003 remake of Freaky Friday, which required her to learn how to play the guitar and to sing. Lohan recorded a song for the soundtrack, "Ultimate", which was released to Radio Disney to help promote the film. It peaked at number 18 on Radio Disney's Top 30. Lohan announced that the song was separate from her singing career, since many teen idols such as Hilary Duff and Raven-Symoné were expanding their careers from acting to singing.

In 2003, Lohan recorded four songs including a Radio Disney hit, "Drama Queen (That Girl)", that were released for the soundtrack to the 2004 film Confessions of a Teenage Drama Queen. Lohan began writing the tracks on her album in April 2004. "I write a lot of lyrics and I'm involved in the producing process, because it's like, if I'm singing it, I want it to be something that I can relate to", Lohan said. "I'm just trying to feel it out and see where it goes. I'm playing guitar and I also love to dance, so [the music will be] somewhere along the lines of hip-hop and rock." She had begun working with Diane Warren and Randy Jackson, who were going to help write and produce her album. Warren wrote the song "I Decide" for Lohan, which was originally going to be on her album. 
When Lohan decided not to collaborate with Warren and Jackson, "I Decide" was instead released on the soundtrack to the 2004 film The Princess Diaries 2: Royal Engagement and on Radio Disney.

By 2004, Lohan's deal with Emilio Estefan Jr. had been cancelled and Lohan began looking for producers for her album. When asked by MTV about what label she would be working with, Lohan said, "I met with Jive, Universal and I spoke to someone at Bad Boy the other day, which would be kind of cool, but we'll see what happens." In the summer, Lohan revealed that she had signed a deal with Casablanca Records, whose parent company is Universal Music Group. Kara DioGuardi and John Shanks both wrote and produced ten of the tracks, six with Lohan. Cory Rooney produced her first single, "Rumors," with Taryll and T. J. Jackson, sons of Tito Jackson.

Recording

Production on the album and the film were halted on October 21, 2004 when Lohan was rushed to Cedars-Sinai Medical Center, reportedly for exhaustion and a high fever of 103 degrees. Lohan ended up having a kidney infection and was also in the middle of a family crisis when her father Michael was arrested earlier that year. After staying in the hospital for six days, Lohan was released and returned to set to finish filming the film and recording her album. "I was over-scheduling myself", Lohan said in her appearance on The Ellen DeGeneres Show, "It's important to say no." Her album's original release date was in November, but was pushed back to December 7 to let Lohan finish recording her album after her hospital stay.

According to Rodney Jerkins, Lohan recorded a track written by him titled "Extraordinary." The song, which is a rock song, never made it to the final cut of the album. "We're just waiting to get into the studio and cut it. I know her schedule is crazy hectic as well as mine. So we're going to find that day where we can get it and cut it, probably out here in L.A. or whatever. It should be fun, because she's got this whole thing about, you know, this little bad-girl image that everyone's trying to put on her, you know what I mean? Basically, the record that we did is basically saying, you know, 'I'm not ordinary. Bottom line, I'm different.'"

Composition
Speak features different styles of music such as pop rock, dance-pop, arena rock and soft rock ballads. "I wanted to have a mixture like that because I love those kinds of club tracks that you can listen to before you go out at night with all your friends. And I also wanted stuff that was a little bit more rock that you could get into if you were like angry or depressed or sad or that. I wanted to be able to touch upon all those feelings and I wanted to speak about all different things, too, which is why I titled the album Speak", Lohan said in an interview with IGN. The lead single, "Rumors", has been called a "bass-heavy, angry club anthem" by Rolling Stone.

In the opening tracks on the album, Lohan sings about her relationship with her boyfriend, possibly Valderrama. The Madonna-esque title track is about communicating with her boyfriend, while "Magnet" states that she keeps coming back for more from him. IGN said that "Over", the second single, "begins like a Cure track, complete with mournful acoustic guitar and haunting piano-tuned synth."

Critical reception

Speak received mixed reviews from music critics. CD Universe said "'Speak' proves that Lohan has the mettle and talent necessary to compete with other young pop superstars." Stephen Thomas Erlewine of Allmusic was very critical of the album, saying it "was recorded quickly and rushed into the stores" such that "the whole thing is a slick, ugly nadir of 2000s pop culture." He called her music "a blend of old-fashioned, Britney-styled dance-pop and the anthemic, arena rock sound pioneered by fellow tween stars Hilary Duff and Ashlee Simpson. [However,] Lohan stands apart from the pack with her party-ready attitude and her husky voice."

IGN gave the album a mixed review, stating, "As with her contemporaries—Britney, Christina, Ashlee, Avril, Hilary—it remains to be seen if she will transcend the generic pop princess model and grow into a mature, insightful artist. For now, Speak  offers up sugar coated, prefab pop that is easily digested, but just as easily forgotten." Entertainment Weekly also gave the album a C, stating "The Mean Girls star's debut album has some guilty pleasures: "Rumors" dramatically slams the very stalkerazzi who made her a household name, while the tween-slumber-party-friendly "Over" is perfect for singing into your curling iron in front of the mirror. But somewhere, Avril Lavigne — whose influence is clearly at work here — is rolling her eyes." People music critic Chuck Arnold gave the album a "promising" review, stating that the album is a "competent collection of teen pop."

Commercial performance
Speak debuted at number four on the US Billboard 200 chart with first week sales of over 261,000. It was certified Platinum by the RIAA and has sold over 1,100,000 copies in the United States.

Promotion
To promote Speak, Lohan did several performances in the United States. Lohan appeared on Sessions@AOL on December 2, where she performed "Rumors", "Over" and "Speak". Her first televised appearance was on Good Morning America on December 6, as a part of the Women Rule Concert Series. While she sang "Over" with no problems, her mouth did not move for a second during the performance of "Rumors". Lohan denied that she was lip synching, claiming that there was a backing track because she had fallen ill recently and that the song had to be enhanced from an electric-pop song to an acoustic version. Kim Jakwerth, of Casablanca Records, supported this statement by saying, "She did not lip-synch. Lindsay sang 100 percent live. Her band played 100 percent live. The background singers were 100 percent live. Yes, on the first song there were background tracks, which were not on the second song."

On December 14, Lohan performed "Over" and "Speak" at Yahoo's Live@Launch, where she also shared an interview. Her second televised appearance was on The Ellen Show on December 16, where she performed "Over". Her third and final televised appearance in promotion for the album was on December 31, where she performed "Rumors" on MTV's Iced Out New Year's Eve 2005. On May 14, 2005, Lohan performed at KIIS-FM's Wango Tango. She performed "First" and "Speak", and shared the bill with other popular performers such as Kelly Clarkson, The Black Eyed Peas and Gwen Stefani. In between songs, Lohan mentioned that this was a rare live performance. In an interview, Lohan mentioned the possibility of touring in Japan: "I start shooting my next movie Lady Luck which will come out 2005 as well probably just a little bit later. Then hopefully more singles to come. I'll be recording another album by then. Maybe touring in Japan and everywhere. That’ll be nice." While she didn't tour in Japan, Lohan was scheduled to tour in Taiwan after learning that her album had been certified Gold. "I would love to (tour Taiwan). I haven't toured at all at this point, but I would really 
love to do that. It's a great feeling to know that people in other places and other countries are aware of my music and what I do", Lohan told to reporters.

Singles

"Rumors" was released as the album's lead single on September 21, 2004. It peaked at number six on Billboard's Bubbling Under Hot 100 Singles chart. Its accompanying music video received heavy airplay on MTV's TRL. "Rumors" was certified Gold by the Recording Industry Association of America (RIAA) due to strong digital downloads. The song was nominated for "Best Pop Video" at the 2005 MTV Video Music Awards. "Over" was released as the second single on December 14, 2004. It spent three weeks at number one on the Bubbling Under Hot 100 Singles chart, but was less successful than "Rumors". "Over" was the first and only single that was released in the United Kingdom. Its music video was also played substantially on TRL, before having to be retired. Both received substantial radio airplay.

The album's title track, "Speak", was supposed to be released as the third single. Lohan even promoted the song by playing it at Sessions@AOL. Francis Lawrence was supposed to direct the music video. "First" was released instead on May 10, 2005. It was also the first single released from the Herbie: Fully Loaded soundtrack. "First" became a hit in Latin America and parts of Europe, but was unsuccessful on US charts.

Track listing
Credits adapted from the album's liner notes

Notes
 Marion Raven is uncredited in the album's liner notes
 signifies a co-producer

Credits and personnel

 Dave Audé – engineer
 Chris Avedon – engineer
 Lauren Bialek – production coordination
 Charlie Bisharat – violin, concertmaster
 Sandy Brummels – creative director
 Denyse Buffam – viola
 David Campbell – string arrangements
 Roberto Cani – violin
 Andreas Carlson – guitar, backing vocals, producer, engineer
 Vinnie Colaiuta – drums
 Larry Corbett – cello
 Mario Diaz de Leon – violin
 Kara DioGuardi – backing vocals, producer
 Peter Wade Keusch – mixing, co-producer, engineer
 Kalle Engstrom – bass, keyboards, programming, producer, engineer
 David Eriksen – drums, backing vocals, producer, engineer, keyboard programming
 Charlie Falk – guitar
 Lars Fox – engineer
 Armen Garabedian – violin
 Berj Garabedian – violin
 Lior Goldenberg – mixing
 Alan Grunfeld – violin
 Jimmy Harry – producer
 George Holz – photography
 Ted Jensen – mastering
 Suzie Katayama – cello
 Peter Kent – violin
 Jason Lader – keyboard programming
 Lindsay Lohan – lead vocals
 Kristian Lundin – keyboards, programming, producer, engineer
 Darrin McCann – viola
 Tommy Mottola – executive producer
 Jamie Muhoberac – keyboards
 Pablo Munguia – engineer
 Anna Nordell – backing vocals
 Börge Petersen Överlei – guitar
 Shelly Peiken – backing vocals
 Herb Powers – mastering
 Bill Richards – product manager
 Matthew Rolston – photography
 Cory Rooney – keyboards, backing vocals, producer
 Jeff Rothschild – drums, programming, engineer, mixing
 John Shanks – guitar, drums, bass, keyboards, producer, mixing
 Martin Sjolie – engineer, assistant producer
 Harry "Slick" Sommerdahl – bass, drums, keyboards, engineer
 Joe Spix – hand lettering
 Sarah Thornblade – violin
 Mark Valentine – engineer
 Dave Way – mixing
 Christopher J. Wormer – guitar

Charts

Weekly charts

Year-end charts

Certifications

Release history

References

2004 debut albums
Albums produced by Cory Rooney
Albums produced by John Shanks
Casablanca Records albums
Lindsay Lohan albums